Leo Philip Cowley (February 3, 1913 – August 18, 1973) was the Roman Catholic Titular Bishop of Pertusa and the auxiliary bishop of the Roman Catholic Archdiocese of Saint Paul and Minneapolis, Minnesota.

Born in Saint Paul, Minnesota, Cowley was ordained a priest for the then Saint Paul Archdiocese on June 4, 1938. On November 28, 1957, he was appointed the auxiliary bishop of the archdiocese and died while still in office.

Notes

 Clergy from Saint Paul, Minnesota
 Roman Catholic Archdiocese of Saint Paul and Minneapolis
 Participants in the Second Vatican Council
1913 births
1973 deaths
20th-century Roman Catholic bishops in the United States
 Religious leaders from Minnesota